Loudoun County, Virginia is divided into eight magisterial districts: Algonkian, Ashburn, Blue Ridge, Broad Run, Catoctin, Dulles, Leesburg, and Sterling. The magisterial districts each elect one supervisor to the Board of Supervisors which governs Loudoun County. There is also a Chair elected by the county at-large, bringing total Board membership to nine. A Vice-Chair is selected by the Board from among its membership. The current Chair is Phyllis Randall. The current Vice-Chair is Koran Saines, the Sterling District Supervisor. He has served as Vice-Chair since January 2020. Board members serve four-year terms. Salaries for the current Board term of 2020-2023 were set by the previous Board in July 2017.

Responsibilities
The Board of Supervisors sets county policies, adopts ordinances, appropriates funds, approves land rezonings and special exceptions to the zoning ordinance, and carries out other responsibilities set forth by the State Code. The Board appoints a County Administrator, who manages county operations; the Planning Commission, which serves in an advisory capacity on land use issues; and various other boards and commissions. The Board also appoints the County Attorney. The Board of Supervisors acts within the limits set forth by the Virginia General Assembly.

Meeting schedule
The Board of Supervisors meeting schedule is set forth is its Rules of Order. Business meetings typically occur twice monthly, beginning on the first Tuesday of the month at 5:00 p.m. The Board holds one public hearing monthly, currently on the Wednesday at 6:00 p.m. that follows the first business meeting. The second business meeting occurs at 5:00 p.m. on the next Tuesday following the public hearing. The Board's standing committees also usually meet monthly. The meetings are held at the Loudoun County Government Center, 1 Harrison Street, S.E. in Leesburg. The Board's official meeting schedule is published in accordance with § 2.2-3707 of Virginia Freedom of Information Act (FOIA) on the master calendar on the county's website.

Actions
As empowered by the Code of Virginia, the Board of Supervisors typically takes action within its purview during each of its business meetings, public hearings, and standing committee meetings. The Board has both administrative and legislative responsibilities, some of which are discharged in the role of the local governing body and some of which have derived from its function as an administrative subdivision of the state. The powers and duties of the Board of Supervisors include:

 Adopting the county budget (establishing appropriations and setting the tax rates);
 Approving and enforcing the county's comprehensive land use plan and related ordinances;
 Making and enforcing ordinances for public safety, sanitation, health and other regulations permitted by state laws; and
 Providing for the care and treatment of indigent and handicapped citizens.

Over time, a Board of Supervisors may take thousands of individual actions in open session by motion and majority vote during its meetings. The official actions of the Loudoun County Board of Superiors are documented on the county's website, in the form of a copy teste, a "true copy" of the county's official record of Board actions, produced, signed, and published by the clerk on the county's website.

Current membership 

Currently, Democrats hold six seats on the board. Republicans hold three seats. Sterling District Supervisor, Koran Saines, has served as Vice-Chair since January 2020.

Past memberships 

In November 2015, Loudoun voters made history when they elected their first two Black supervisors: Phyllis Randall (Chair-At-Large) and Koran Saines (Sterling). They also elected their youngest-ever supervisor, Broad Run District Supervisor Ron Meyer, who was 26 at the time of his election. Ashburn District Supervisor, Ralph Buona, served as Vice-Chair all four years of the term.

In November 2011, Republicans were elected to all nine seats on the Board. Over the course of the four-year term, three supervisors served as the Vice-Chair: Janet Clarke (Blue Ridge), Shawn Williams (Broad Run), and Ralph Buona (Ashburn). Clarke was elected Vice-Chair on January 3, 2012, and served until December 31, 2012, choosing not to hold the position a second year. On January 2, 2013, Williams was elected to serve as the next Vice-Chair, a position he held until March 2015. Williams resigned the Vice-Chair post on March 16, 2015, after a 2006 arrest for assault in Ocean City, Maryland resurfaced. Two days later, on March 18, 2015, the Board elected Buona as the new Vice-Chair, a position he held through the remainder of the term. On September 6, 2015, Shawn Williams, the Broad Run District Supervisor, resigned his supervisor position after being arrested for simple assault and unlawful entry earlier that day. The Board appointed Jim Bonfils to fill the Broad Run District seat on September 21, 2015, from a list of 13 applicants (including former Broad Run District Supervisors Steve Stockman, David McWatters, and Chuck Harris). Bonfils was sworn in on September 22, 2015, and served out the remaining 101 days of the term.

In November 2007, voters removed four incumbent, fiscally conservative Republicans from the board of supervisors in a backlash over rapid development in the county's eastern portion. The board's make-up after the election was five Democrats, two Republicans, and two Independents. This was also the first, and to date only, time women made up a majority of the Board members (Buckley, Waters, Kurtz, Burk, McGimsey). Sugarland Run District Supervisor, Susan Klimek Buckley, served as Vice-Chair all four years of the term.

The 2003 board, and other officials in Loudoun, was the subject of a federal investigation of possible corruption relating to a land deal involving the Royal Saudi Academy. Potomac District Supervisor, Bruce Tulloch, served as Vice-Chair all four years of the term.

In November 1995, Dale Polen Myers became the first woman to be elected at-large to chair the Board.

In November 1990, Loudoun voters approved the addition of a ninth, Chair-at-large seat via a referendum vote. In November 1991, the newly created Chair-at-large seat was elected for the first time with Republicans claiming eight of the nine seats on the Board. The sole Democrat on the Board, Mercer District Supervisor Thomas Dodson, later resigned his position effective December 31, 1993, after taking a job out of the area. The Board appointed Republican Ready Snodgrass in January 1994 to fill the Mercer District seat, bringing the Board under total Republican control. She subsequently won the November 8, 1994, special election to permanently fill the seat.

In November 1987, Alice Bird defeated her ex-husband, two-term incumbent Andrew Bird, in a bid for the Sterling District seat. On September 5, 1989, Alice Bird announced she was resigning her position effective October 1, 1989, to take a job in Georgia. In October 1989, the Board appointed Howard Smith to temporarily fill the vacant Sterling District seat until a special election could be held in November 1990. Smith lost the November 6, 1990, special election to Roger Zurn, flipping the Sterling District seat from Democrat to Republican. Leesburg District Supervisor Charles Bos held the Vice-Chair position all four years of the term. 

In November 1983, Loudoun voters elected four Democrats and four Republicans to the Board of Supervisors, making for an even split. The Supervisors agreed to alternate the Chair position between a Republican and a Democrat ever year for the four-year term. Blue Ridge District Supervisor James Brownell served as Chair during both the Republican years, first from January 1984 to December 1984, and second from January 1986 to December 1986. Democratic Leesburg District Supervisor Frank Raflo served as Chair from January 1985 to December 1985. On January 5, 1987, Democratic Guilford District Supervisor Betty Tatum was elected Chair, become the first woman in the history of the Board of Supervisors to lead the group. In December 1986, Leesburg District Supervisor Frank Raflo resigned due to health reasons. Later that month, the Board appointed Charles Bos to fill the Leesburg District seat and serve out the remainder of the term.

In June 1981, Guilford District Supervisor Gerry Gardner resigned for personal reasons and left the area. The Board appointed Betty Tatum in July 1981 to fill the Guilford District seat until a special election could be held that November. Tatum ran in and won the November 3, 1981, special election, defeating former Guilford District Supervisor Bob Scheetz. Broad Run District Supervisor Carl Henrickson held the Chair position until December 1981. Mercer District Supervisor Thomas Dodson was Chair from January 1982 to December 1983.

Due to rapid development around the continually growing Sterling area, the populations of the Broad Run and Sterling Districts were vastly greater than the populations of the other five districts. To address this population discrepancy, throughout 1974 and 1975, the Board went through a redistricting process in the eastern part of Loudoun County. Through the redistricting process, the Board approved a plan to split the area consisting of the existing Broad Run and Sterling Districts into three districts, thus creating one new district. This newly added eighth district would be called the Guilford District. Due to the redistricting occurring in an election year, the Supervisor for the newly created district had to be appointed. On December 16, 1975, Bob Scheetz was sworn-in as the Guilford District supervisor. Carl Hendrickson and George Yeager were also sworn-in on the same day to take their seats as Supervisors for the redrawn Broad Run and Sterling Districts.  Before the November 1976 special election was held to permanently fill the Guilford seat, Scheetz was challenged by Gerry Gardner in a Democratic primary that same year. Gardner won the Democratic primary, and subsequently won the November 2, 1976, special election as well, becoming the first woman to serve on the Loudoun County Board of Supervisors.

In June 1978, Sterling District Supervisor George Yeager, the Board Chair since January 1978, resigned his seat to accept a job in West Virginia, effective July 11, 1978. The Board appointed Shannon Geddie to fill the Sterling District seat, becoming the second woman to serve on the Loudoun County Board of Supervisors when she was sworn in on July 17, 1978. She won the 1978 special election to retain the Supervisor position, but later lost the 1979 general election. The Chair position formerly held by Yeager was filled by Broad Run District Supervisor Carl Henrickson. Dulles District Supervisor Henry Stowers remained Vice-Chair. During this term, Mercer District Supervisor William Crossman, a Democrat, held the Chair position from January 1976 to December 1977.

After the completion of the 1970 Census, the Board went through a redistricting process in 1971. On June 23, 1971, the Board adopted its new districts, dropping the Jefferson, Lovettsville, and Mount Gilead district names in favor of Dulles, Catoctin, and Blue Ridge. The Sterling District was also created, bringing the total number of districts to seven.

In October 1974, Sterling District Supervisor Paul Walstad resigned, with the October 15, 1974, meeting being his last. James Cave was appointed by a judge to fill the vacant Sterling District seat, attending his first meeting on November 5, 1974.

On January 2, 1968, Mercer District Supervisor William Leach was elected Chair of the Board and served as chair for the entire term. On September 5, 1970, Lovettsville District Supervisor Bob McClain died after being in the hospital. Former Lovettsville District Supervisor James Arnold was appointed to fill the seat.

Board Chair, Lovettsville District Supervisor Irvey Baker, died on February 10, 1955. At the March 7, 1955, Board meeting, Hayward Thompson was elected to serve as Chair for the remainder of the term and James Arnold was appointed to fill the Lovettsville District seat.

Jefferson District Supervisor Homer Mock resigned at the end of 1949. His successor was appointed at the January 3, 1950, meeting to complete the unexpired term.

Jefferson District Supervisor William Thompson died on April 18, 1922, and Mercer District Supervisor George Frasier died on May 20, 1922. Their successors were both appointed the following months.

Mount Gilead District Supervisor Thomas Benton James served as Chair until his death on June 1, 1915. Leesburg District Supervisor Michael Whitmore was unanimously elected Chair on June 14, 1915. James' successor as the Mount Gilead District Supervisor, James Robert Cochran, was appointed by and attending the June 14, 1915, meeting.

Long-serving Lovettsville District Supervisor John Crim died on May 17, 1912. His successor, Samuel George, was appointed in the following months, attending the July 22, 1912, meeting. Samuel George later resigned in late 1914 with his successor, William Frazier, appointed and attending the December 5, 1914, meeting.

Election district maps

References

External links
 Official Website of Loudoun County Government
 Board of Supervisors

Government in Loudoun County, Virginia
County government in Virginia